Taurikura is a small, rural township in the Whangarei District, approximately 30 kilometres south east of Whangarei city in Northland, New Zealand. The town is located on the shores of Calliope Bay at the base of 420 metre high Mt Manaia which, along with Bream Head and the Hen Island, collectively form the ancient remnants of a very large andesitic volcano.

Features of Taurikura include a Baptist-owned camp and a general store. The local school, Whangarei Heads School, is the second oldest school in New Zealand still operating on its original site. The town offers a range of views of the Marsden Point Oil Refinery located on the opposite shore of Whangarei Harbour. A number of ocean beaches are also a short drive away.

References

External links
 Whangarei Heads Tourism

Whangarei District
Populated places in the Northland Region